Craxton is a surname. Notable people with the surname include:

 Harold Craxton (1885–1971), English pianist and composer
 Janet Craxton (1929–1981), English oboist and teacher, daughter of Harold
 John Craxton (1922–2009), English painter, son of Harold
 Reg Craxton (active 1920s), association football goalkeeper from New Zealand